Luis La Puerta de Mendoza (August 25, 1811 – October 21, 1896) was a 19th-century Peruvian politician. He was born in Cusco. He was briefly Prime Minister of Peru in January 1868. He served as the first vice president from 1876 to 1879 and was briefly president for five days in 1879 during the War of the Pacific.

References

Bibliography
 Aparicio, Manuel J.: Cusco en la Guerra con Chile. Cuzco: INC, 2003
 Basadre, Jorge: Historia de la República del Perú. 1822 - 1933, Octava Edición, corregida y aumentada. Tomos 5, 6, 7 y 8. Editada por el Diario "La República" de Lima y la Universidad "Ricardo Palma". Impreso en Santiago de Chile, 1998.
 Fonseca, Juan: Un Estado en Formación (1827-1883). Tomo X de la “Historia del Perú” publicada por la Empresa Editora El Comercio S.A, 2010. 
 Orrego, Juan Luis: La República Oligárquica  (1850-1950). Incluida en la Historia del Perú. Lima, Lexus Editores, 2000. 
 Tauro del Pino, Alberto: Enciclopedia Ilustrada del Perú. Tercera Edición. Tomo 9, JAB/LLO. Lima, PEISA, 2001. 
 Vargas Ugarte, Rubén: Historia General del Perú. Tomos IX y X. Primera Edición. Editor Carlos Milla Batres. Lima, Perú, 1971.

External links

1811 births
1896 deaths
People from Cusco
Peruvian soldiers
Vice presidents of Peru